Mandrocles  was an ancient Greek engineer from Samos who built a pontoon bridge over the Bosporus for King Darius I  to conquer Thrace. Mandrocles dedicated a painting, depicting the bridging of the straits, to the goddess Hera in the Heraion of Samos, commemorating his achievement.

References
Histories (Herodotus)  4. 88 (Scythian campaign)

Ancient Greek engineers
Greek people of the Greco-Persian Wars
Ancient Samians
Achaemenid Thrace